Virginia Ice & Freezing Corporation Cold Storage Warehouse is a historic cold-storage warehouse building in Norfolk, Virginia, United States. It was built in 1920, and is a three-story concrete block building on a concrete foundation, built in three sections. The sections are a two-story, eight-bay warehouse; a three-story, L-shaped addition; and a two-story concrete block addition. The Virginia Ice & Freezing Corp. had one of the largest ice and cold storage operations in Norfolk and was next to several of the leading oyster and fish processing plants.

It was listed on the National Register of Historic Places in 2009.

References

Ice trade
Industrial buildings and structures on the National Register of Historic Places in Virginia
Industrial buildings completed in 1920
Buildings and structures in Norfolk, Virginia
National Register of Historic Places in Norfolk, Virginia